Andrey Nikolayevich Bukhlitsky (born 7 February 1982) is a former Russian beach soccer player who represented Russia in international competitions. His role was goalkeeper.

Bukhlitsky is a quite successful goalkeeper who was selected as the best keeper of EBSL 2007 season, captured the best keeper award in season regular phase event for 3 times consecutive in that season. He is currently a goalkeeper coach for the national team.

Achievements

National team
 2007 Season
 EBSL Superfinal, Marseille, France: 3rd Place
 EBSL Regular Phase Event, Tignes, France: Champions
 EBSL Regular Phase Event, San Benedetto del Tronto, Italy: Champions
 2008 Season
 ESBL Regular Phase Event, Tignes, France: Champions (beaten France 8–3 at final)
 FIFA World Cup: Marseille, France: Quarter-Finals (lost to Brazil)
 2011 Season
 2011 FIFA Beach Soccer World Cup, Ravenna, Italy: Champions

Individual
 2007 Season
 ESBL Total season: Best Goalkeeper
 EBSL Regular Phase Event, Tignes, France: Best Goalkeeper
 EBSL Regular Phase Event, Portimão, Portugal: Best Goalkeeper
 EBSL Regular Phase Event, San Benedetto del Tronto, Italy: Best Goalkeeper
 2008 Season
 EBSL Regular Stage Event, Tignes, France: Best Goalkeeper
 2011 Season
 2011 FIFA Beach Soccer World Cup: adidas Golden Glove
 2012 Season
Merited Master of Sports (21 December 2012)

Club
 Lokomotiv Moscow (beach soccer)
Russian National Beach Soccer Championship (1): 2011
Russian National Beach Soccer Championship — Best Goalkeeper (1): 2011

External links
 Profile on BSWW
 LJ Blog

References

1982 births
Living people
Russian footballers
Footballers from Moscow
Russian beach soccer players
Association football goalkeepers
Beach soccer goalkeepers
FC Izhevsk players
European Games gold medalists for Russia
Beach soccer players at the 2015 European Games
European Games medalists in beach soccer
Russian expatriate footballers
Expatriate footballers in Spain
Russian expatriate sportspeople in Spain
FC Kuzbass Kemerovo